Dilani Perera Abeywardana (born October 29, 1969 as ඩිලානි අබේවර්ධන) [Sinhala]), is a retired actress in Sri Lankan cinema, theater and television. Started her career in 1990s, she is best known for the dramatic roles in films Juriya Mamai, Sujatha and Chandani.

Personal life
Dilani Abeywardana was born on 29 October 1969 in Kalubowila, Colombo.

She is married to singer Saman Pushpawarna. They currently lives in United States and Dilani works as a beauty consultant in Staten Island.

The couple has one daughter, Kaveesha Kavindi and one son. Kavindi was born on September 12, 1996 in Colombo. Kaveesha made her film debut with 2015 film Singa Machan Charlie directed by Lal Weerasinghe. She has recorded her single in June, Samanalee written by Ananda Padmasiri and composed by Sanjula Himala. Her first song was Mandaram Adure with Kanishka Salinda. Kaveesha is married to Sri Lankan international cricketer Shehan Jayasuriya where the wedding was celebrated on 23 September 2020 in New York, USA.

Acting career
Her maiden cinematic experience came through a supportive role in 1988 film Satana, directed by Ananda Wickramasinghe. Since then, she acted many commercially successful films both in dramatic and comedy roles. Some of her popular films are Juriya Mamai, Sujatha, Chandani, Danduwama, Weli Sulanga, Boradiya Pokuna and Pissu Puso.

In 1989, she won the Sarasaviya award for the Best upcoming actress for the maiden role in Satana. Then she won Best actress award in Sarasaviya for Sayanage Sihinaya in 1993 and for Bithu Sithuwam in 1997. In 2003, she won a merit award for the dramatic role in the film Seethala Gini Kandu.

Apart from cinema, Abeywardana acted in few stage plays such as Bima Karanam and Ukussa. She also acted in popular television serials such as Charitha Thunak, Sakisanda Eliyas, and Sabanda Pabilis.

Selected television serials

 Charitha Thunak
 Indrakeelaya
 Issaraha Gedara
 Kahala Nadaya 
 Magi
 Maruk Mal
 Monara Kirilli 
 Sabanda Pabilis
 Sakisanda Eliyas
 Senuri
 Sivusiya Gawwa
 Sudu Mal Kanda
 Sujatha 
 Thalaya Soyana Geethaya
 Uthurukuru Satana

Filmography

References

External links
 Exhuming some redeeming qualities of Sinhala cinema

Living people
Sri Lankan film actresses
1970 births